"You've Got It Bad" is a song by English rock band Ocean Colour Scene. The song was released as the second single from their second album, Moseley Shoals (1996), on 25 March 1996 and reached number seven on the UK Singles Chart. The single was also released as a demo alternative on a second CD with additional B-sides. In the United States, the song was serviced to alternative radio in August 1996.

Track listings
UK CD1
 "You've Got It Bad"
 "Robin Hood"
 "I Wanna Stay Alive with You"
 "Huckleberry Grove"

UK CD2
 "You've Got It Bad" (demo version)
 "Here in My Heart"
 "Men of Such Opinion"
 "Beautiful Losers"

UK cassette single
 "You've Got It Bad"
 "I Wanna Stay Alive with You"

Credits and personnel
Credits are taken from the Moseley Shoals album booklet.

Studio
 Recorded and mixed at Moseley Shoals (Birmingham, England)
 Mastered at the Powerplant (London, England)

Personnel

 Ocean Colour Scene – writing, production
 Simon Fowler – vocals, acoustic guitar
 Steve Cradock – guitar, piano, vocals
 Oscar Harrison – drums, piano, vocals
 Damon Minchella – bass guitar
 Brendan Lynch – production
 Martin Heyes – engineering
 Tony Keach – assistant engineering
 Tim Young – mastering

Charts

Release history

References

Ocean Colour Scene songs
1996 singles
1996 songs
MCA Records singles
Song recordings produced by Brendan Lynch (music producer)
Songs written by Damon Minchella
Songs written by Oscar Harrison
Songs written by Simon Fowler
Songs written by Steve Cradock